Federico Mendez (2 August 1972, Mendoza), also known as Freddie Mendez is an Argentine rugby union footballer.
Méndez played professional rugby in South Africa, England and France. He also played for Mendoza Rugby Club in Argentina and won 74 caps for the Argentina national rugby union team, including appearances at four Rugby World Cups, in 1991, 1995 and 2003. Mendez was considered the best hooker at the 1995 World Cup and had the unique ability to play hooker, loosehead or tighthead.

Biography

Playing career

Méndez started his career with Mendoza RC in his hometown; he made his Argentina debut as a teenager, and was sent off in a match against England for a punch on English lock Paul Ackford in 1990.

He played for Bath Rugby and Northampton Saints in England. He won the Heineken Cup in 1998 with Bath (as a replacement) and then in 2000 with Northampton, thus becoming the first player to win the trophy twice. Mendez also won the player of the season award for Northampton Saints in the 1998–99 season.

Méndez then has a spell in France with Bordeaux-Bègles and a second spell with Sharks before returning to Argentina to play for Mendoza RC.

Coaching career
Méndez announced his retirement from rugby in 2005, but returned to the game later that year for a brief spell as player-coach at Western Province in South Africa. He then went on to coach at his beloved Mendoza RC.

He recently turned down the position of scrum coach for the South African Springboks. He said he could not live with himself if he helped the Boks beat the Argentinian Pumas.

Méndez is currently on the panel of judges for the annual IRB Awards.

References

External links
RWC 2003 profile

 

1972 births
Living people
Sportspeople from Mendoza, Argentina
Bath Rugby players
Northampton Saints players
Argentine rugby union players
Sharks (Currie Cup) players
Western Province (rugby union) players
Rugby union hookers
Argentine rugby union coaches
Argentina international rugby union players
Argentine expatriate sportspeople in South Africa
Argentine expatriate sportspeople in France
Argentine expatriate sportspeople in England
CA Bordeaux-Bègles Gironde players
Argentine expatriate rugby union players
Expatriate rugby union players in France
Expatriate rugby union players in England